Tischeria ekebladioides is a moth of the family Tischeriidae. It is known from Spain, Portugal and Tunisia.

The larvae feed on Quercus mirbeckii, Quercus canariensis and Quercus suber. They mine the leaves of their host plant.

References

Tischeriidae
Moths described in 2003